Farsajin (also Romanized as Fārsajīn, Fārsījīn, Farsagin, Fārsejīn, Fārsjīn, and Parsadzhin) is a village in Dodangeh-ye Olya Rural District, Ziaabad District, Takestan County, Qazvin Province, Iran. At the 2006 census, its population was 1,849, in 575 families.

The 14th-century author Hamdallah Mustawfi listed Farsajin (as Fārisjīn) as one of the main villages in the territory of Qazvin.

References 

Populated places in Takestan County